Lagarobasidium is a genus of corticioid fungi in the Schizoporaceae family. Circumscribed by Swiss mycologist Walter Jülich in 1974, the genus contain three species.

References

External links

Hymenochaetales
Agaricomycetes genera
Taxa named by Walter Jülich